CTi Variety is a satellite cable channel operated by Chung T'ien Television in Taiwan.

External links
 CTi Variety official website

Television stations in Taiwan
Television channels and stations established in 1994
1994 establishments in Taiwan